The Ulmus pumila cultivar 'Aurescens' was introduced by Georg Dieck at the National Arboretum, Zöschen, Germany, circa 1885. Dieck grew the tree from seed collected in the Ili valley, Turkestan (then a region of Russia, now part of Kazakhstan) by the lawyer and amateur naturalist Vladislav E. Niedzwiecki while in exile there. Dieck originally named the tree U. pinnato-ramosa f. aurescens.

Description
'Aurescens' is distinguished by its golden leaves on emergent shoots in spring; the foliage reverts to dark green by summer.

Pests and diseases
This cultivar has not been scientifically tested for Dutch elm disease resistance, however several old specimens have survived unscathed by the disease in the UK. (see Notable trees).

Cultivation
The tree is rare in Europe and unknown in North America and Australasia. In trials in England, it quickly perished where grown on winter-waterlogged ground.

Notable trees
Two mature specimens are known in the UK: one at Bute Park Arboretum, Cardiff, planted c. 1980, height 15 m × 65 cm d.b.h. in 2004; another grows in a private garden at Seaford, East Sussex (see Accessions).

Accessions
Europe
Brighton & Hove City Council, UK, NCCPG Elm Collection. One tree in a private garden Seaford, East Sussex, recorded in 1995.
Bute Park Arboretum, Cardiff, UK. One tree, tag number 1907, planted c. 1980, no other accession details available.
Grange Farm Arboretum, Sutton St James, Spalding, Lincolnshire, UK. As U. pumila var. arborea 'Aurescens'. Acc. no. 1092.
Wijdemeren City Council, Netherlands. Elm collection. Planted Overmeerseweg, Nederhorst den Berg 2015.

Nurseries

Europe
 Noordplant , Glimmen, Netherlands.

References

Siberian elm cultivar
Ulmus articles with images